was a Japanese operatic soprano who spent much of her career singing the title role of Madame Butterfly.

Biography
Yoko was born in Kitakyushu city, Fukuoka Prefecture, where her father practiced medicine. She first studied piano, and then studied vocal when she reached high school age. Following her high school graduation, she studied at the Tokyo University of the Arts. After she graduated in 1976, she left for Italy, studying at Teatro alla Scala Academy of Lyric Opera for two years. She made her stage debut in the role of Nedda in Pagliacci in 1983, after which she sung in Italy.

She was also known for her large repertoire including such works as Micaela in Carmen, Donna Elvira in Don Giovanni, Marguerite in Faust and Amelia in Verdi's Simon Boccanegra. She returned to Japan in 1985 for her much-celebrated first performance at home with the Fujiwara Opera troupe, as the title role in Puccini's Madama Butterfly, her signature role.

Watanabe died from cancer in her Milan home on 15 July, 2004 at the age of 51.

References

External links 
 Obituary from the New York Times
 Obituary from the Associated Press
 Biography of Yoko Watanabe
 Biography of Yoko Watanabe(in Japanese)

1953 births
2004 deaths
Japanese operatic sopranos
Japanese expatriates in Italy
Deaths from cancer in Lombardy
Musicians from Fukuoka Prefecture
20th-century Japanese women opera singers
Tokyo University of the Arts alumni